Club Atlético de la Juventud Alianza (usually called Juventud Alianza) is a sports club based in the city of Santa Lucía, San Juan, Argentina. Although other sports are practised at the club, Juventud Alianza is mostly known for its football team, which currently plays in the Torneo Argentino B, the regionalised 4th division of the Argentine football league system. Juventud Alianza was originally formed in 1905 under the name Atletico Juventud. The club changed to its current name in the 1970s.

See also
List of football clubs in Argentina
Argentine football league system

External links
Official website
La Página Lechuza

 
Association football clubs established in 1973
1973 establishments in Argentina